11 Puppis is a single star in the southern constellation of Puppis, located approximately 522 light years away based on parallax. It has the Bayer designation j Puppis; 11 Puppis is the Flamsteed designation. This object is visible to the naked eye as a faint, yellow-white star with an apparent visual magnitude of 4.20. It is moving further from the Earth with a heliocentric radial velocity of +13.3 km/s.

This is an evolved bright giant star with a stellar classification of F7/8 II. The spectrum displays a deficit of carbon, an excesses of nitrogen, and a high abundance of lithium. The first two anomalies suggest the giant has passed through a deep convection stage that would have also exhausted the lithium supply, indicating the current lithium abundance is of recent production. The star has 2.7 times the mass of the Sun and is radiating 515 times the Sun's luminosity from its enlarged photosphere at an effective temperature of 5,868 K.

References

F-type bright giants
Puppis
Puppis, j
BD-22 2087
Puppis, 11
065228
038835
3102